Jan Collaert the Elder or (I), Hans Collaert the Elder or Johannes Collaert (Brussels, between 1525 and 1530 – Antwerp, October 1580) was a Flemish printmaker, publisher, draftsman, tapestry designer, glass painter and designer and engraver of swords. He was the founder of a dynasty of engravers that would play a significant role in establishing Antwerp as one of the leading centres for printmaking in Europe in the second half of the 16th century and the early 17th century.

Life

Jan Collaert the Elder was born in Brussels as the son of Jannen (Jan) Collaert. His father was a designer and painter of cartoons for tapestries. Jan likely trained with his father. After a career as a draftsman producing designs for glass makers, tapestry makers and embroiderers in Brussels, he moved sometime before 1563 to Antwerp where he created designs for the local tapestry workshops. He also provided designs for jewelry.

His first dated print was published by Hieronymous Cock (1518-1570) in 1555. Collaert engraved plates to the designs by other artists for several print publishers in Antwerp during the 1570s. He married Anna van der Heyden, with whom he had four children: Adriaen (c. 1555/65 - 1618)., Hansken (Jan or Hans) (1561 - 1620/1628), Tanneken and Susanna.

The sons would later work in the workshop of Philip Galle and marry Galle's daughters. The workshops of the Collaert and Galle families were close together and their works are hard to distinguish.

He died in Antwerp in October 1580.

Work
Collaert was known for his engravings after designs by contemporary artists, usually from the Northern Renaissance.

Collaert engraved a sword that was formerly in the collection formed in the nineteenth century by Prince Charles of Prussia and is now in the collection of the Deutsches Historisches Museum in Berlin. The sword blade was made by Damiano de Nerve between 1540 and 1581 and etched by Collaert after his own design.  The signature IAN . COLLART appears in one of the figures engraved on the blade. The blade is etched with representations of the Planets on one side and Virtues on the other.  The figures are in a vertical row.

Selected works
He left many works including:
 Life of Saint Francis, 16 prints
 Views of Brussels and its surroundings, after Hans Bol and Jacob Grimmer, 24 prints, published before 1580 
 Last Judgment, folio
Monilium, Bullarum, Inauriumque Artificiosissimae Icones, 10 prints, 1581
The Dead Christ in his Mother's Lap
Marcus Curtius
Moses Striking the Rock, and The Resurrection of Lazarus, after Lambert Lombard
The Fathers of the Desert
Biblia Sacra and the History of the Church, after Rubens.

References

External links

1520s births
1580 deaths
16th-century engravers
Flemish engravers
Flemish Renaissance painters
Flemish publishers
Flemish tapestry artists
Artists from Brussels
Artists from Antwerp